The 2012 Sparkassen Open was a professional tennis tournament played on clay courts. It was the 19th edition of the tournament which was part of the 2012 ATP Challenger Tour. It took place in Braunschweig, Germany between 2 and 8 July 2012.

Singles main draw entrants

Seeds

 1 Rankings are as of June 25, 2012.

Other entrants
The following players received wildcards into the singles main draw:
  Carlos Berlocq
  Peter Heller
  Julian Reister
  Jan-Lennard Struff

The following players received entry as a special exempt into the singles main draw:
  Tommy Robredo

The following players received entry from the qualifying draw:
  Farrukh Dustov
  Filip Horanský
  Michał Przysiężny
  Artem Smirnov

Champions

Singles

 Thomaz Bellucci def.  Tobias Kamke, 7–6(7–4), 6–3

Doubles

 Tomasz Bednarek /  Mateusz Kowalczyk def.  Harri Heliövaara /  Denys Molchanov, 7–5, 6–7(1–7), [10–8]

External links
Official Website

Sparkassen Open
Sparkassen Open
2012 in German tennis